This is a list of invasive species in South Africa, including invasive species of plants, animals, and other organisms in South Africa.

A list of invasive species has been published under the National Environmental Management: Biodiversity Act of 2004.

Microorganisms
Microorganisms considered to be invasive species include:

Algae
Invasive species of algae include:
Codium fragile ssp. tomentosoides – dead man's fingers
Hypnea musciformis – hypnea
Kappaphycus spp. – agar-agars

Plants

Invasive species of plants include:

Acacia adunca – cascade wattle
Acacia baileyana – Bailey's wattle
Acacia cyclops – red eye
Acacia decurrens – green wattle
Acacia elata – pepper tree wattle
Acacia mearnsii – black wattle
Acacia melanoxylon – Australian blackwood
Acacia podalyriifolia – pearl acacia
Acacia saligna – Port Jackson willow
Acacia stricta – hop wattle
Agave sisalana – sisal
Agrimonia procera – fragrant agrimony
Ailanthus altissima – tree of heaven
Alisma plantago-aquatica – common water-plantain
Anredera cordifolia – Madeira vine
Antigonon leptopus – coral creeper
Ardisia elliptica – shoebutton ardisia
Aristolochia littoralis – elegant Dutchman's pipe
Atriplex lindleyi ssp. inflata – spongefruit saltbush
Atriplex nummularia – old man saltbush
Austrocylindropuntia subulata – longspine cactus
Azolla pinnata ssp. asiatica – mosquito fern
Bartlettina sordida – blue mist flower
Bauhinia purpurea – butterfly orchid tree
Bauhinia variegata – orchid tree
Billardiera heterophylla – bluebell creeper
Cabomba caroliniana – Carolina fanwort
Caesalpinia gilliesii – bird of paradise bush
Callisia repens – creeping inchplant
Calotropis procera – apple of Sodom
Cardiospermum grandiflorum – showy balloon vine
Casuarina cunninghamiana – beefwood
Casuarina equisetifolia – horsetail tree
Catharanthus roseus – Madagascar rosy periwinkle
Cestrum spp. – jessamines
Chondrilla juncea – skeletonweed
Cirsium japonicum – Japanese thistle
Cotoneaster franchetii – Franchet's cotoneaster
Cotoneaster glaucophyllus – late cotoneaster
Cotoneaster pannosus – silverleaf cotoneaster
Cotoneaster salicifolius – willow-leaved cotoneaster
Cotoneaster simonsii – Himalayan cotoneaster
Crotalaria agatiflora – canarybird bush
Cryptostegia madagascariensis – Madagascar rubber vine
Cylindropuntia fulgida – jumping cholla
Cylindropuntia imbricata – imbricate cholla
Diplocyclos palmatus – lollipop-climber
Dipogon lignosus – Australian pea
Dolichandra unguis-cati – catclaw creeper
Echinodorus cordifolius – creeping burhead
Echinodorus tenellus – Amazon sword plant
Egeria densa – Brazilian waterweed
Eichhornia crassipes – common water hyacinth
Elodea canadensis – Canadian waterweed
Equisetum hyemale – rough horsetail
Eriobotrya japonica – loquat
Eucalyptus camaldulensis – river red gum
Eucalyptus cladocalyx – sugar gum
Eucalyptus diversicolor – karri
Eucalyptus grandis – rose gum
Eucalyptus paniculata – grey ironbark
Eucalyptus sideroxylon – red ironbark
Euphorbia esula – leafy spurge
Euphorbia leucocephala – pascuita
Fallopia sachalinensis – giant knotweed
Flaveria bidentis – smelter's bush
Galium tricornutum – corn cleavers
Genista monspessulana – Montpellier broom
Gleditsia triacanthos – honey locust
Grevillea banksii – red silky oak
Homalanthus populifolius – bleeding heart
Hydrilla verticillata – hydrilla
Hydrocleys nymphoides – water poppy
Hylocereus undatus – night-blooming cereus
Hypericum androsaemum – tutsan
Hypericum perforatum – common St. John's wort
Ipomoea carnea ssp. fistulosa – morning-glory bush
Ipomoea purpurea – tall morning glory
Iris pseudacorus – yellow flag
Jacaranda mimosifolia – blue jacaranda
Jatropha gossypiifolia – cotton-leaf physic nut
Kalanchoe delagoensis – chandelier plant
Kali tragus – Russian thistle
Kunzea ericoides – burgan
Lantana spp. – lantanas
Ligustrum japonicum – Japanese privet
Ligustrum lucidum – glossy privet
Ligustrum ovalifolium – California privet
Ligustrum sinense – Chinese privet
Ligustrum vulgare – common privet
Lilium formosanum – Formosa lily
Linaria dalmatica – Dalmatian toadflax
Linaria vulgaris – common toadflax
Ludwigia peruviana – Peruvian primrosebush
Lythrum hyssopifolia – hyssop loosestrife
Lythrum salicaria – purple loosestrife
Malva arborea – tree mallow
Malva verticillata – Chinese mallow
Malvastrum coromandelianum – prickly malvastrum
Marsilea mutica – nardoo
Melaleuca hypericifolia – hillock bush
Melia azedarach – Persian lilac
Metrosideros excelsa – New Zealand Christmas tree
Mimosa pigra – giant sensitive plant
Mirabilis jalapa – marvel of Peru
Morus alba – white mulberry
Myoporum laetum – New Zealand manatoka
Myriophyllum aquaticum – parrotfeather
Nasturtium officinale – watercress
Nephrolepis exaltata – sword fern
Nicandra physalodes – apple of Peru
Nuphar lutea – yellow water-lily
Nymphaea mexicana – Mexican water-lily
Nymphoides peltata – yellow floating-heart
Opuntia engelmannii – Engelmann's prickly-pear
Opuntia microdasys – bunny ears cactus
Orobanche ramosa – branching broomrape
Parkinsonia aculeata – Mexican palo verde
Paspalum quadrifarium – tussock paspalum
Passiflora tarminiana – banana passionfruit
Passiflora tripartita – banana passionfruit
Paulownia tomentosa – empress tree
Pennisetum purpureum – Napier grass
Persicaria capitata – pink-head knotweed
Phytolacca americana – American pokeweed
Phytolacca dioica – belhambra
Phytolacca icosandra – tropical pokeweed
Pinus canariensis – Canary Islands pine
Pinus elliottii – slash pine
Pinus halepensis – Aleppo pine
Pinus patula – patula pine
Pinus pinaster – cluster pine
Pinus radiata – Monterey pine
Pinus roxburghii – chir pine
Pinus taeda – loblolly pine
Plectranthus barbatus – Indian coleus
Pontederia cordata – pickerelweed
Populus alba – white poplar
Potentilla indica – mock strawberry
Prosopis glandulosa – honey mesquite
Prosopis velutina – velvet mesquite
Prunus serotina – black cherry
Psidium cattleianum – strawberry guava
Psidium × durbanensis – Durban guava
Psidium guajava – common guava
Psidium guineense – Brazilian guava
Pueraria montana – kudzu
Pyracantha angustifolia – narrowleaf firethorn
Pyracantha coccinea – red firethorn
Pyracantha crenatoserrata – broadleaf firethorn
Pyracantha crenulata – Himalayan firethorn
Pyracantha koidzumii – Formosa firethorn
Pyracantha rogersiana – Asian firethorn
Ricinus communis – castor oil plant
Robinia pseudoacacia – black locust
Rubus armeniacus – Himalayan blackberry
Rubus flagellaris – common dewberry
Rubus fruticosus – European blackberry
Rubus niveus – Ceylon raspberry
Rumex usambarensis – East African dock
Salix babylonica – weeping willow
Salix × fragilis – crack willow
Salsola kali – tumbleweed
Salvia tiliifolia – lindenleaf sage
Salvinia molesta – giant salvinia
Sambucus canadensis – Canadian elder
Sambucus nigra – European elder
Senna bicapsularis – rambling senna
Senna didymobotrya – peanut butter cassia
Senna hirsuta – woolly senna
Senna occidentalis – septicweed
Senna pendula – Christmas senna
Senna septemtrionalis – arsenic bush
Solanum chrysotrichum – giant devil's fig
Solanum pseudocapsicum – Jerusalem cherry
Sorghum halepense – Johnson grass
Syngonium podophyllum – arrowhead vine
Syzygium cumini – jambolan
Syzygium jambos – rose apple
Tamarix aphylla – Athel tree
Tamarix gallica – French tamarisk
Tephrocactus articulatus – pine cone cactus
Tipuana tipu – tipu tree
Toona ciliata – toon
Toxicodendron succedaneum – wax tree
Tradescantia fluminensis – small-leaf spiderwort
Tradescantia zebrina – inchplant
Verbena bonariensis – tall verbena
Verbena brasiliensis – Brazilian verbena
Vinca major – greater periwinkle
Vinca minor – lesser periwinkle
Vitex trifolia – Indian three-leaf vitex

Tunicates
Invasive species of tunicates include:

Annelids
Invsive species of annelids include:
Ficopomatus enigmaticus – Australian tubeworm
 Boccardia proboscidea – shell worm

Molluscs
Invasive species of molluscs include:

 Aplexa marmorata – marbled tadpole snail 
Bradybaena similaris – Asian trampsnail
Cochlicella barbara – potbellied helicellid
 Deroceras invadens – tramp slug
Deroceras laeve – marsh slug
Cornu aspersum – garden snail
Limax flavus – yellow slug
Milax gagates – greenhouse slug
Mytilus galloprovincialis – Mediterranean mussel
Pseudosuccinea columella – mimic lymnaea
 Semimytilus algosus – Pacific mussel 
Tarebia granifera – quilted melania
Theba pisana – white garden snail
Zonitoides arboreus – quick gloss

Crustaceans
Invasive species of crustaceans include:
Carcinus maenas – European shore crab
Cherax quadricarinatus – redclaw crayfish
Procambarus clarkii – red swamp crayfish

Insects
Invasive species of insects include:
Aedes albopictus – Asian tiger mosquito
Anoplolepis gracilipes – yellow crazy ant
 Aphis spiraecola – green citrus aphid 
 Aulacaspis yasumatsui – cycad aulacaspis scale 
 Bactrocera invadens – Asian fruit fly
 Bemisia tabaci – silverleaf whitefly
Cactoblastis cactorum – cactus moth
 Cinara cupressi – cypress aphid 
Coptotermes formosanus – Formosan subterranean termite
 Cosmopolites sordidus – banana root borer 
 Cryptotermes brevis – West Indian drywood termite
 Ctenarytaina eucalypti – blue gum psyllid 
 Eulachnus rileyi – pine needle aphid 
 Frankliniella occidentalis – western flower thrips 
Harmonia axyridis – Asian lady beetle
Hylastes ater – black pine bark beetle
 Hylurgus ligniperda – red-haired pine bark beetle 
 Icerya purchasi – cottony cushion scale 
Linepithema humile – Argentine ant
Orthotomicus erosus – Mediterranean pine engraver
 Phenacoccus manihoti – cassava mealybug 
 Pineus pini – pine woolly aphid 
Polistes dominula – European paper wasp
 Pseudococcus calceolariae – Citrophilus mealybug 
Sirex noctilio – Sirex woodwasp
Technomyrmex albipes – white-footed ant 
 Thaumastocoris peregrinus – bronze bug 
Vespula germanica – European wasp
 Xyleborinus saxesenii – fruit-tree pinhole borer 
 Xylosandrus compactus – black twig borer

Fish
Invasive species of fish include:
Ctenopharyngodon idella – grass carp
Cyprinus carpio – common carp
Gambusia affinis – western mosquitofish
Hypophthalmichthys molitrix – silver carp
Lepomis macrochirus – bluegill
Micropterus dolomieu – smallmouth bass
Micropterus punctulatus – spotted bass
Micropterus salmoides – largemouth bass
Micropterus salmoides floridanus – Florida bass
Oreochromis niloticus – Nile tilapia (and hybrids)
Perca fluviatilis – European perch
Pterygoplichthys disjunctivus – vermiculated sailfin catfish
Salmo salar – Atlantic salmon
Tinca tinca – tench

Amphibians
Invasive species of amphibians include:
 Amietophrynus gutturalis – guttural toad

Reptiles
Invasive species of reptiles include:
 Emys orbicularis – European pond turtle 
Gehyra mutilata – stump-tailed gecko
Hemidactylus frenatus – common house gecko
Lepidodactylus lugubris – mourning gecko
Tarentola mauritanica – Moorish wall gecko
Trachemys scripta ssp. elegans – red-eared slider

Birds
Invasive species of birds include:
Acridotheres tristis – common myna
Anas platyrhynchos – mallard (and hybrids)
Columba livia – rock dove
Corvus splendens – house crow
Fringilla coelebs – common chaffinch
Sturus vulgaris  – European starling

Mammals
Invasive species of mammals include:
 Felis silvestris – cat 
Hemitragus jemlahicus – Himalayan tahr
Mus musculus – house mouse
 Rattus rattus – black rat
Sus scrofa – feral pig

See also
Lists of invasive species

References

External links
Invasives.org.za: Invasive Species South Africa website

Invasive 01
.List
Invasive
South Africa
South Africa
L
L